Pardosa semicana is a species of spider of the genus Pardosa. It is native to China, Malaysia and Sri Lanka.

See also 
 List of Lycosidae species

References

semicana
Spiders of Asia
Spiders described in 1885